Bojary  is a village in the administrative district of Gmina Kosów Lacki, within Sokołów County, Masovian Voivodeship, in east-central Poland.

The village has an approximate population of 100. It lies south of the river Bug, at an approximate elevation of 100m above sea level.

References

Bojary